Holland is a city in Grundy County, Iowa, United States. The population was 269 at the time of the 2020 census. It is part of the Waterloo–Cedar Falls Metropolitan Statistical Area.

Geography
Holland is located at  (42.399708, -92.799487).

Demographics

2010 census
As of the census of 2010, there were 282 people, 107 households, and 77 families living in the city. The racial makeup of the city was 99.6% White and 0.4% from two or more races.

There were 107 households, of which 34.6% had children under the age of 18 living with them, 59.8% were married couples living together, 4.7% had a female householder with no husband present, 7.5% had a male householder with no wife present, and 28.0% were non-families. 24.3% of all households were made up of individuals, and 13% had someone living alone who was 65 years of age or older. The average household size was 2.64 and the average family size was 3.12.

The median age in the city was 35.5 years. 29.1% of residents were under the age of 18; 6.8% were between the ages of 18 and 24; 28% were from 25 to 44; 21.6% were from 45 to 64; and 14.5% were 65 years of age or older. The gender makeup of the city was 51.4% male and 48.6% female.

2000 census
As of the census of 2000, there were 250 people, 105 households, and 76 families living in the city. The racial makeup of the city was 99.60% White and 0.40% Asian.

There were 105 households, out of which 30.5% had children under the age of 18 living with them, 68.6% were married couples living together, 3.8% had a female householder with no husband present, and 27.6% were non-families. 25.7% of all households were made up of individuals, and 17.1% had someone living alone who was 65 years of age or older. The average household size was 2.38 and the average family size was 2.87.

In the city, the population was spread out, with 23.2% under the age of 18, 4.4% from 18 to 24, 27.6% from 25 to 44, 20.0% from 45 to 64, and 24.8% who were 65 years of age or older. The median age was 41 years. For every 100 females, there were 81.2 males. For every 100 females age 18 and over, there were 84.6 males.

The median income for a household in the city was $34,886, and the median income for a family was $38,125. Males had a median income of $29,375 versus $20,250 for females. The per capita income for the city was $15,370. About 7.5% of families and 6.3% of the population were below the poverty line, including 8.3% of those under the age of eighteen and 17.3% of those 65 or over.
The mayor of Holland IA is Scott Borchardt(2017)

Education
Grundy Center Community School District operates area public schools.

References

Cities in Iowa
Cities in Grundy County, Iowa
Waterloo – Cedar Falls metropolitan area